Harold Vick (April 3, 1936 – November 13, 1987) was an American jazz saxophonist and flutist.

Biography

Harold Vick was born on April 3, 1936 in Rocky Mount, North Carolina.  At the age of 13 he was given a clarinet by his uncle, Prince Robinson, a clarinet and tenor saxophone player who had been a member of McKinney's Cotton Pickers. Three years later he took up the tenor saxophone, and soon began playing in R&B bands. He continued to perform, still largely with R&B bands, while studying psychology at Howard University.

Recordings as leader

Steppin' Out!, Vick's first album as leader, was recorded for Blue Note in 1963.  After a 1965 performance at Carnegie Hall with Donald Byrd, Vick secured a contract for further albums as leader, and from 1966 to 1974 he had further recording sessions for the RCA, Muse, and Strata-East labels.

Work as sideman

Vick worked as a sideman with Jack McDuff from 1960 to 1964, and also with other organists such as Jimmy McGriff, Big John Patton, and Larry Young.  For the rest of the 1960s he played on and off with Walter Bishop, Jr., and also worked with Philly Joe Jones, Howard McGhee, Donald Byrd and Ray Charles, and appeared with Dizzy Gillespie at the 1968 Newport Jazz Festival.

Vick then worked for around 5 years with soul artists, from 1969 to 1970 with King Curtis, and from 1970 to 1974 with Aretha Franklin.  He played in Jack DeJohnette's jazz-rock band Compost from 1971 to 1973, recording with them in 1972.

After a heart attack in the mid 1970s, Vick largely returned to soul jazz, working with Shirley Scott from 1974 to 1976 and with Jimmy McGriff from 1980 to 1981. At the same time he continued to work as a freelance jazz musician and session musician.  As late as 1987 he performed on two Billie Holiday tribute albums by Abbey Lincoln.

He also played with Nat Adderley, Mercer Ellington, Sarah Vaughan, Billy Taylor, Horace Silver, and Gene Ammons.

Film and theatre

During the 1960s Vick worked as a member of the house band at the Apollo Theater, and in 1969 he toured Europe as a musician with the Negro Ensemble Company. He also played for a number of stage productions during the 1980s.

He appeared in the films Stardust Memories (1981) and The Cotton Club (1984), in which he played a musician. He was also cast for the Spike Lee film School Daze (1988), and undertook work for the soundtracks for a number of other films.

Death

Vick died at his Manhattan home of a heart attack on November 13, 1987.  He was memorialised by the tune "Did You See Harold Vick?", which Sonny Rollins wrote and featured on his album This Is What I Do (2000).

Discography

As leader
1963: Steppin' Out! (Blue Note) 
1966: The Caribbean Suite (RCA Victor) 
1966: Straight Up (RCA Victor) 
1967: Commitment (Muse), released 1974
1967: Watch What Happens (RCA Victor) 
1973: The Power of Feeling (Encounter Records, released under the name "Sir Edward")
1974: Don't Look Back (Strata-East) 
1977: After the Dance (Wolf)

As sideman
With Walter Bishop Jr.
Coral Keys (Black Jazz, 1971)
With Compost
Compost (Columbia, 1972)
Life Is Round (Columbia, 1973)
With Joe Chambers
The Almoravid (Muse, 1974)
With Grant Green
His Majesty King Funk  (Verve, 1965)
The Final Comedown (Blue Note, 1971)
With Richard "Groove" Holmes
Soul Mist! (Prestige, 1966 [rel. 1970])
With Sam Jones
Something New (Interplay, 1979)
With Mike Longo
Talk with the Spirits (Pablo, 1976)
With Les McCann 
Another Beginning (Atlantic, 1974)
With Jack McDuff
Goodnight, It's Time to Go (Prestige, 1961)
On With It! (Prestige, 1961 [1971])
Brother Jack Meets the Boss (Prestige, 1962) - with Gene Ammons
Soul Summit Vol. 2 (Prestige, 1962) - with Gene Ammons
Somethin' Slick! (Prestige, 1963)
Crash! (Prestige, 1963) - with Kenny Burrell
Brother Jack at the Jazz Workshop Live! (Prestige, 1963)
Soul Circle (Prestige, 1964-66 [rel. 1968])
Steppin' Out (Prestige, 1961-66 [rel. 1969])
The Fourth Dimension (Cadet, 1974)
Live It Up (Sugar Hill, 1984)
With Jimmy McGriff
 City Lights (JAM, 1981)
Movin' Upside the Blues (JAM, 1982)
With Bob Moses
Home in Motion (Ra-Kalam, 2012)
With Jimmy Owens
Headin' Home (A&M/Horizon, 1978)
With John Patton
Along Came John (Blue Note, 1963)
Oh Baby! (Blue Note, 1965)
With Duke Pearson
Prairie Dog (Atlantic, 1966)
With Houston Person
Houston Express (Prestige, 1971)
With Bu Pleasant
Ms. Bu (Muse, 1973)
With Bernard Purdie
Soul Is... Pretty Purdie (Flying Dutchman, 1972)
With Pharoah Sanders
Live at the East (Impulse!, 1972)
With Shirley Scott
One for Me (Strata-East, 1974)
With Horace Silver
Total Response (Blue Note, 1971)
All (Blue Note, 1972)
The United States of Mind (Blue Note, 2004; compilation of both above albums)
With Charles Tolliver
Impact (Strata-East, 1975)
With McCoy Tyner
Cosmos (Blue Note, tracks with Vick recorded 1969 [rel. 1977])
With Johnny Hammond
Wild Horses Rock Steady (Kudu, 1971)
Gambler's Life (Salvation, 1974)
With Larry Willis
Inner Crisis (Groove Merchant, 1973)

References

American jazz saxophonists
American male saxophonists
American jazz flautists
Hard bop saxophonists
Soul-jazz saxophonists
Hard bop flautists
Soul-jazz flautists
1936 births
1987 deaths
People from Rocky Mount, North Carolina
Strata-East Records artists
Blue Note Records artists
Muse Records artists
20th-century American saxophonists
Jazz musicians from North Carolina
20th-century American male musicians
American male jazz musicians
Compost (band) members
20th-century flautists